The Asian Chess Championship is a chess tournament open to all players from Asian chess federations (FIDE zones from 3.1 to 3.7). It's held with the Swiss system and consists in two divisions, Open and Women's, the latter of which is reserved to female players. Both sections determine the Asian champions and qualify a certain number of players for the FIDE World Cup and knockout Women's World Chess Championship respectively.

The 2007 championship was a FIDE Zone 3 qualification event for the 2007 Chess World Cup, the next stage in the 2010 World Chess Championship. Ten players qualified for the 2007 World Cup: Zhang Pengxiang (China), Wang Hao (China), Abhijit Kunte (India), Zhao Jun (China), Susanto Megaranto (Indonesia), Wen Yang (China), Darwin Laylo (Philippines), Zhou Jianchao (China), G. N. Gopal (India), Hossain Enamul (Bangladesh).

Ten players qualified for the 2009 Chess World Cup: Ganguly Surya Shekhar (India), Zhou Weiqi (China), Yu Yangyi (China), Yu Shaoteng (China), Lê Quang Liêm (Vietnam), Rogelio Antonio Jr. (Philippines), Hou Yifan (China), Zhou Jianchao (China), Chanda Sandipan (India), and Sasikiran Krishnan (India).

Winners
{| class="sortable wikitable"
! Nr !! Year !! City !!Winner
|-
| 1 ||	1998	|| Tehran	   ||	 
|-
| 2 ||	2000	|| Udaipur	   ||	 
|-
| 3 ||  2001    || Kolkata	   ||	 
|-
| 4 ||  2003    || Doha        ||    
|-
| 5 ||  2005    || Hyderabad   ||    
|-
| 6 ||  2007    || Cebu City   ||   
|-
| 7 ||  2009    || Subic Bay Freeport Zone  ||   
|-
| 8 ||  2010    || Subic Bay Freeport Zone   ||	
|-
| 9 ||  2011    || Mashhad	   ||	
|-
| 10 || 2012 || Ho Chi Minh City || 
|-
| 11 || 2013 || Manila || 
|-
| 12 || 2014 || Sharjah || 
|-
| 13 || 2015 || Al Ain || 
|-
| 14 || 2016 || Tashkent || 
|-
| 15 || 2017 || Chengdu || 
|-
| 16 || 2018 || Makati || 	
|-
| 17 || 2019 || Xingtai || 
|-
| 18 || 2022 || New Delhi || 
|}

Women's winners
{| class="sortable wikitable"

|-
| 1 ||  1981 || Hyderabad    || 
|-
| 2 ||  1983 || Kuala Lumpur || 
|-
| 3 ||  1985 || Dhaka        || 
|-
| 4 ||  1987 || Hyderabad    || 
|-
| 5 ||  1991 || Bhopal       || 
|-
| 6 ||  1996 || Salem        || 
|-
| 7 ||  1998 || Kuala Lumpur || 
|-
| 8 ||	2000 || Udaipur      ||  
|-
| 9 ||  2001 || Chennai      || 
|-
| 10 || 2003 || Kozhikode      || 
|-
| 11 || 2004 || Beirut       || 
|- 
| 12 || 2007 || Tehran       || 
|-
| 13 || 2009 || Subic Bay Freeport Zone       || 
|-
| 14 || 2010 || Subic Bay Freeport Zone       || 
|-
| 15 || 2011 || Mashhad      || 
|-
| 16 || 2012 || Ho Chi Minh City      || 
|-
| 17 || 2013 || Manila || 
|-
| 18 || 2014 || Sharjah || 
|-
| 19 || 2015 || Al Ain || 
|-
| 20 || 2016 || Tashkent ||  
|-
| 21 || 2017 || Chengdu || 
|-
| 22 || 2018 || Makati || 	
|-
| 23 || 2019 || Xingtai || 
|-
| 24 || 2022 || New Delhi || 
|}

See also
 World Chess Championship
 Asian Senior Chess Championship

Notes

References
 Selected tournament results 1981-2005
 Tournament report of edition 2000, 2001, 2003, 2005, 2007, 2009 
 Results women's championship 1981-1996, 1998, 2000, 2001 2003, 2004, 2007
 Complete standings from Chess-Results.com: 2007 (Open), 2007 (Women) 2009, 2010, 2011 (Open), 2011 (Women), 2012, 2014, 2015, 2016
 Asian Continental 2013 in THE WEEK IN CHESS: 2013

Supranational chess championships
Women's chess competitions
Chess
Chess in Asia
Recurring sporting events established in 1981